Charles Edward Johnston (February 11, 1896 - August 29, 1988) was a Major League Baseball umpire who worked in the American League in  and . Johnson umpired 270 Major League games.

References

External links
 The Sporting News Umpire Card

1896 births
1988 deaths
Major League Baseball umpires
Sportspeople from Texas